Cattleya jongheana, commonly known as the Jonghe's cattleya, is a species of orchid endemic to Brazil (Minas Gerais).

References

External links 
 

jongheana
jongheana
Endemic orchids of Brazil
Orchids of Minas Gerais